Deltentosteus is a genus of gobies native to the eastern Atlantic Ocean and the Mediterranean Sea.

Species
There are currently two recognized species in this genus:
 Deltentosteus collonianus (A. Risso, 1820) (Toothed goby)
 Deltentosteus quadrimaculatus (Valenciennes, 1837) (Four-spotted goby)

References

Gobiidae